Southern Seminary may refer to:

 Lutheran Theological Southern Seminary 
 Southern Virginia University
 Southern Baptist Theological Seminary